Kawama Airport  is an airport serving Varadero, in the Matanzas Province in Cuba.

History
Kawama Airport was the original international airport serving Varadero. It served over 330,000 Cubans who fled the country for the United States during the Freedom Flights. However, as the tourism sector in the region developed, Kawama Airport grew too close to the beaches and resorts, creating noise issues for visitors. In addition, the nearby hotel developments would hinder attempts at expanding the airport. As a result, the new Juan Gualberto Gómez Airport opened in 1989 to replace Kawama Airport. Most flights operated out of Kawama Airport now are operated by Aerogaviota and ENSA. These are most commonly skydiving charters for tourists and charters for media, among others.

Facilities
The airport is remnant of the old Varadero airport which was replaced by the new international Varadero airport in the 90's. The runway was shortened and now is used only for small aircraft for touristic and sport purpose. The disused section of the runway is still used for aircraft reaching the north tarmac.

References

Airports in Cuba
Cárdenas, Cuba
Buildings and structures in Matanzas Province